V538 Aurigae is a single star in the northern constellation of Auriga. With an apparent visual magnitude of 6.23, this star requires good dark sky conditions to view with the naked eye. The star is drifting further away with a radial velocity of 0.9 km/s. It is a member of the Local Association, and is most likely a thin disk star.

This is a BY Draconis variable, which means it undergoes changes in luminosity because regions of pronounced surface magnetic activity are moved into and out of the line of sight from the Earth as the star rotates (once every 11 days). It has a spectral class of K1 V, indicating that it is a K-type main sequence star. The star has 87% of the mass of the Sun and 82% of the Sun's radius. It is an estimated 3.76 billion years old. The star is radiating 48% of the Sun's luminosity from its photosphere at an effective temperature of 5,303 K.

It has a common proper motion companion designated Vys 465 (HD 233153), which is a red dwarf with a class of M0.5V and a visual magnitude of 9.87.

References

External links
 GJ 211 Nearby Stars Catalog VizieR entry
 HR 1925 Bright Star Catalog VizieR entry
 CCDM J05413+5329 CCDM catalog VizieR entry
 Image V538 Aurigae Aladin image

K-type main-sequence stars
BY Draconis variables
Aurigae, V538

Auriga (constellation)
Durchmusterung objects
0211
037394
026779
1925
Aurigae, V538